Rhododendron yunnanense (云南杜鹃) is a species of rhododendron native to Myanmar and Guizhou, Shaanxi, Sichuan, Xizang, and Yunnan, China, where it grows at altitudes of 2200–3600 meters. It is a shrub that grows to 1–2 m in height, with leaves that are oblong, lanceolate, oblong-lanceolate or obovate, 2.5–7 by 0.8–3m in size. Flowers are white, pale red, or pale purple.

In cultivation in the UK the cultivar ‘Openwood‘ has gained the Royal Horticultural Society’s Award of Garden Merit. The flowers are a pale lavender with a crimson spotted throat.

References 

 "Rhododendron yunnanense", Franchet, Bull. Soc. Bot. France. 33: 232. 1886.
 The Plant List
 Flora of China
 Hirsutum.com
 Danish Soc. of ARS

yunnanense
Flora of China
Flora of Myanmar